Humshaugh railway station served the village of Chollerford, Northumberland, England from 1858 to 1958 on the Border Counties Railway.

History 
The station was opened as Chollerford on 5 April 1858 by the North British Railway.

It was situated on the east side of Military Road on the B6318 at the end of Chollerford Bridge over the River North Tyne. Nearby sidings gave access to a lime depot until the 1890s. There were two loops in front of the platform and three further sidings, two running diagonally behind the platform and the third running parallel with the running line. The siding at the southwest end of the platform served a cattle dock and the good shed, which had an awning over the platform. The goods yard had a two-ton crane.

The station was host to a LNER camping coach from 1935 to 1939 and possibly one for some of 1934.

The station closed to passengers on 15 October 1956 and to goods traffic on 1 September 1958.

References

External links 
Humshaugh station at disused stations

Disused railway stations in Northumberland
Former North British Railway stations
Railway stations in Great Britain opened in 1858
Railway stations in Great Britain closed in 1956
1858 establishments in England
1958 disestablishments in England
Wall, Northumberland